Zelenoborsky is an urban locality (an urban-type settlement) in Kandalakshsky District of Murmansk Oblast, Russia, located directly west of the Kola Peninsula on the lower Kovda River,  south of Murmansk. Population: 

It was founded as a work settlement around 1951.

References

Urban-type settlements in Murmansk Oblast
Kandalakshsky District